"Emotional Rollercoaster" is a song co-written and performed by American contemporary R&B singer Vivian Green, issued as the lead single from her debut studio album A Love Story. It is her only hit to date on the Billboard Hot 100, peaking at #39 in 2003. A remixed version of the song also peaked at #1 on the Billboard dance chart.

Music video

The official music video for the song was directed by Scott Stewart.

Charts

Weekly charts

Year-end charts

References

External links
 
 

2002 songs
2002 debut singles
Vivian Green songs
Columbia Records singles
Songs written by Vivian Green
Songs written by Osunlade
Songs written by Eric Roberson
Contemporary R&B ballads
Soul ballads
2000s ballads